The 1894 Penn Quakers football team was an American football team that represented the University of Pennsylvania as an independent during the 1894 college football season. In their third season under head coach George Washington Woodruff, the Quakers compiled a 12–0 record, shut out nine of twelve opponents, and outscored all opponents by a total of 366 to 20.

There was no contemporaneous system in 1894 for determining a national champion. However, Penn was retroactively named as the co-national champion by one selector, Parke H. Davis. Other selectors chose Princeton or Yale as the 1894 national champion Penn defeated Princeton and Harvard in head-to-head competition.

Four Penn players were named to 1894 All-America college football team: halfback Alden Knipe (chosen by Walter Camp, Caspar Whitney, and Leslie's Weekly); halfback George Brooke (chosen by Camp, Whitney, and Leslie's Weekly); end Charles Gelbert (chosen by Camp, Whitney, and Leslie's Weekly); and guard Charles Wharton (chosen by Leslie's Weekly). Three individuals from the 1894 Penn team were later inducted into the College Football Hall of Fame: Gelbert (inducted 1960); coach Woodruff (inducted 1963); and Brooke (inducted 1969).

Schedule

References

Penn
Penn Quakers football seasons
College football national champions
College football undefeated seasons
Penn Quakers football